Summertime! is an EP released by American indie pop band The Drums in 2009 on the Moshi Moshi record label.

Two of the tracks from the EP, "Let's Go Surfing" and "Down By the Water" later appeared on the band's debut album The Drums, released in 2010.

Track listing

Personnel
Jonathan Pierce - vocals
Jacob Graham - guitar
Adam Kessler - guitar
Connor Hanwick - drums

References

The Drums albums
2010 EPs
Island Records EPs